Hals is a harbour and tourist town with a population of 2,521 (1 January 2022) in Region Nordjylland's Aalborg Municipality on the east coast of the Jutland peninsula in northern Denmark.

Notable people 
 Jens Bloch (1761 in Hals – 1830) a Danish theologian and priest, a Bishop in both Norway (briefly) and Denmark
 Søren Wulff Johansson (born 1971 in Hals) a Danish former decathlete; received a lifetime ban from sport after twice failing doping tests

Gallery

References

Towns and settlements in Aalborg Municipality